Tenascin-R is a protein that in humans is encoded by the TNR gene.

Function 

Tenascin-R (TNR) is an extracellular matrix protein expressed primarily in the central nervous system. It is a member of the tenascin (TN) gene family, which includes 4 genes in mammals: TNC (or hexabrachion), TNX (TNXB), TNW (also known as TNN) and TNR. The genes are expressed in distinct tissues at different times during embryonic development and are present in adult tissues.[supplied by OMIM]

References

Further reading 

 
 
 
 
 
 
 
 
 
 
 

Tenascins